British Formula One Racing Team was a Formula One team run by Brian Henton in 1977. Henton, a racing driver who had been competing in Formula One and Two, set up his own team to compete regularly in Formula One. The team purchased a March 761B from March Engineering together with a Cosworth DFV engine, to compete in selected World Championship and Shellsport International Series races. Henton and Bernard de Dryver entered four World Championship races, but failed to qualify for any. The team later shut down through lack of funds.

Complete Formula One World Championship results
(key) (results in bold indicate pole position; results in italics indicate fastest lap)

References 

Formula One entrants
British auto racing teams
Auto racing teams established in 1977
Auto racing teams disestablished in 1977